The Handmaids of Charity  (Italian: Ancelle della Carità; Latin: Congregatio Ancillarum a Charitate; abbreviation: A.D.C.) is a religious institute of pontifical right whose members profess public vows of chastity, poverty, and obedience and follow the evangelical way of life in common.

History
This religious institute was founded in Brescia, Italy, in 1840, by Maria Crocifissa di Rosa.

As of 31 December 2005 there were 1103 sisters in 102 communities in Italy, Croatia, Rwanda, Brazil, and Ecuador.

Their mission includes care of the sick, lepers and elderly. The Generalate of the Congregation can be found in Brescia, Italy.

References

External links
 Handmaids of Charity official site

Catholic female orders and societies
Religious organizations established in 1840
Catholic religious institutes established in the 19th century
1840 establishments in Italy